Nezamabad (also Romanized as Nez̧āmābād) is a village in Almahdi Rural District, Mohammadyar District, Naqadeh County, West Azerbaijan Province, Iran. At the 2006 census, its population was 484, in 117 families.

References 

Populated places in Naqadeh County